Som Kimsuor is a Cambodian politician. She belongs to the Cambodian People's Party and was elected to represent Kampot Province in the National Assembly of Cambodia in 2003.

References

Members of the National Assembly (Cambodia)
Cambodian People's Party politicians
Living people
Year of birth missing (living people)
20th-century Cambodian women
21st-century Cambodian women politicians
21st-century Cambodian politicians